Euhyponomeutoides is a genus of moths of the family Yponomeutidae.

Species
Euhyponomeutoides albithoracellus - Gaj, 1954
Euhyponomeutoides lushanensis - Gozmany, 1960
Euhyponomeutoides namikoae - Moriuti, 1977
Euhyponomeutoides petrias - Meyrick, 1907
Euhyponomeutoides ribesiella - (de Joannis, 1900)
Euhyponomeutoides spadix - J.C. Sohn & C.S. Wu, 2010
Euhyponomeutoides trachydelta - Meyrick, 1931

Yponomeutidae
Moth genera